The 1965 Washington Senators season involved the Senators finishing 8th in the American League with a record of 70 wins and 92 losses.

Offseason 
 November 30, 1964: Tim Cullen was drafted by the Senators from the Boston Red Sox in the 1964 first-year draft.
 December 1, 1964: Chuck Hinton was traded by the Senators to the Cleveland Indians for Woodie Held and Bob Chance.
 December 4, 1964: Claude Osteen, John Kennedy and $100,000 were traded by the Senators to the Los Angeles Dodgers for Frank Howard, Ken McMullen, Phil Ortega, Pete Richert and a player to be named later. The Dodgers completed the deal by sending Dick Nen to the Senators on December 15.

Regular season

Season standings

Record vs. opponents

Notable transactions 
 June 8, 1965: Joe Coleman was drafted by the Senators in the 1st round (3rd pick) of the 1965 Major League Baseball Draft.
 June 8, 1965: Tom Ragland was drafted by the Washington Senators in the 15th round of the 1965 amateur draft.

Roster

Player stats

Batting

Starters by position 
Note: Pos = Position; G = Games played; AB = At bats; H = Hits; Avg. = Batting average; HR = Home runs; RBI = Runs batted in

Other batters 
Note: G = Games played; AB = At bats; H = Hits; Avg. = Batting average; HR = Home runs; RBI = Runs batted in

Pitching

Starting pitchers 
Note: G = Games pitched; IP = Innings pitched; W = Wins; L = Losses; ERA = Earned run average; SO = Strikeouts

Other pitchers 
Note: G = Games pitched; IP = Innings pitched; W = Wins; L = Losses; ERA = Earned run average; SO = Strikeouts

Relief pitchers 
Note: G = Games pitched; W = Wins; L = Losses; SV = Saves; ERA = Earned run average; SO = Strikeouts

Farm system

Notes

References 
1965 Washington Senators team page at Baseball Reference
1965 Washington Senators team page at www.baseball-almanac.com

Texas Rangers seasons
Washington Senators season
Washing